Orlando Catinchi (born May 6, 1957 is a retired male breaststroke and freestyle swimmer from Puerto Rico. He competed for his native country at the 1976 Summer Olympics in Montréal, Canada, aged nineteen.

Two years later Berrocal won the bronze medal in the Men's 4 × 100 m Medley Relay at the 1979 Pan American Games, alongside Carlos Berrocal, Arnaldo Pérez, and Fernando Cañales.

References
 sports-reference

1957 births
Living people
Puerto Rican male swimmers
Male breaststroke swimmers
Puerto Rican male freestyle swimmers
Olympic swimmers of Puerto Rico
Swimmers at the 1976 Summer Olympics
Swimmers at the 1979 Pan American Games
Pan American Games bronze medalists for Puerto Rico
Pan American Games medalists in swimming
Central American and Caribbean Games gold medalists for Puerto Rico
Competitors at the 1978 Central American and Caribbean Games
Central American and Caribbean Games medalists in swimming
Medalists at the 1979 Pan American Games
20th-century Puerto Rican people
21st-century Puerto Rican people